Peebles High School may refer to:

Peebles High School (Ohio) in the United States
Peebles High School, Peeblesshire in Scotland